The members of the 7th General Assembly of Newfoundland were elected in the Newfoundland general election held in November 1859. The general assembly sat from 1860 to 1861.

The Liberal Party led by John Kent won the election and Kent served as Newfoundland's premier.

Ambrose Shea was chosen as speaker until 1861, when Frederick Carter briefly served as speaker.

Sir Alexander Bannerman served as colonial governor of Newfoundland.

In February 1861, Premier Kent accused Governor Bannerman of conspiring with the Conservatives and the judiciary to defeat a bill that would have changed the rate of exchange for the dollar. Bannerman dismissed Kent's government and invited the Conservative leader Hugh Hoyles to form a government. That government subsequently was defeated by a vote of no confidence and a general election was held.

Members of the Assembly 
The following members were elected to the assembly in 1859:

Notes:

By-elections 
By-elections were held to replace members for various reasons:

Notes:

References 

Newfoundland
007